Polyscias rodriguesiana (formerly Gastonia rodriguesiana, locally known as "bois blanc") is a rare species of plant in the family Araliaceae.

Habitat

It is endemic to the island of Rodrigues, in Mauritius. It used to occur throughout Rodrigues island, but was especially common in coastal regions and on limestone or old coral sediments. 
It is now critically endangered.

Description

It has a soft, swollen trunk and thick branches. It can reach a height of 6 meters, but is usually shorter and more compact. 

Its leaves are heterophyllous, like its close relative Polyscias maraisiana on Mauritius island to the west. Adult plants' leaves are shiny, rounded and bright green.

References

rodriguesiana
Endemic flora of Rodrigues
Taxonomy articles created by Polbot